Hirokichi Nadao (21 December 1899 – 22 January 1994) was a Japanese politician. Throughout his career, he served as Minister of Education multiple times, Speaker of the House of Representatives, Minister of Health and Welfare, and Governor of Oita Prefecture.

Nadao was known for his hawkish attitudes. He held an aggressive stance towards Nikkyoso, the teachers' union of Japan, and unions in general (represented by Sōhyō). He was also one of the main people behind Prime Minister Eisaku Satō's foreign policy. In the mid-1970s, he was regarded as one of the most powerful men in Japan.

Career

Nadao was born in Hiroshima Prefecture in 1899. He graduated with a degree in jurisprudence from Tokyo Imperial University and joined the Home Ministry, rising to the position of Vice Minister pre-war. During the war, he served as Governor of Oita Prefecture.

After the war, Nadao became one of the main people who pushed through the 1954 Police Law (as Minister of Health and Welfare at the time). He was also a member of the "Taiwan faction" of Japanese politics, influencing the foreign policy of Prime Minister Eisaku Satō. He served as the chairman of the Diet Members' Talkfest on Japan-China Relations, visiting Taipei with a delegation to meet with Chiang Kai-Shek in 1959 (the first time any Japanese politician had done so since the cutting of ties with Taipei). In March 1973, Nadao created the LDP Members' Talkfest on Japan-China Relations.

As Education Minister, Nadao was one of the chairmen of the Education System Research Council. Under the premiership of Prime Minister Nobusuke Kishi, Nadao was hawkish towards the teacher's union, Nikkyoso, and the general council for trade unions, Sōhyō, arguing that teachers should not argue for better wages because they should teach based on their conviction and duty to their noble profession. His stand against Nikkyoso was what he was known for within the Ministry of Education, and lumped him in with other members of the "education-public peace" or "law and order" clique, or Bunkyo-chian zoku.

Nadao was also responsible for policies pushing national identity through education. In 1968, he voiced his support for teaching children about the Emperor of Japan, his descent from the sun goddess Amaterasu, and the formation of the Japanese monarchy. He also called for an reevaluation of the 6-3-3-4 system (6 years of primary school, 3 years of junior secondary school, 3 years of senior secondary school, and 4 years of university).

After having served as Minister of Education multiple times, Nadao became a main member of the Education Committee of the LDP. In 1976, Nadao was named as one of the most powerful men in Japanese politics.

References

Citations

Bibliography
Books
 
 
 

Journals
 
 
 
 
 
 
 

1899 births
1994 deaths
Speakers of the House of Representatives (Japan)
Governors of Ōita
Education ministers of Japan
Liberal Democratic Party (Japan) politicians
University of Tokyo alumni
People from Hiroshima Prefecture
Ministers of Health and Welfare of Japan